Mikhail Alekseevich Smirnov (born 30 April 2003) is a Russian singer, songwriter and actor.

He represented Russia in the Junior Eurovision Song Contest 2015 with the song "Mechta", where he placed sixth. Smirnov was a finalist of the second season of The Voice Kids in Russia, an actor in the musical Ivanhoe, and a multiple grand prize winner of many Russian and international vocal competitions.

Early life and career

Early Beginnings 
Smirnov was born on 30 April 2003 in Moscow in a family of mathematicians. When he was three, Smirnov suddenly began to stutter and his parents sent him to singing lessons as a therapy.

Smirnov has a huge number of Gran Prix on various Russian and international vocal competitions. He says that his major achievement is the final of the TV show The Voice Kids (Голос. Дети).

Junior Eurovision 2015 and latter part of his career 
In the Russian national final, Smirnov had to battle a series of strong female vocalists, many of whom rode the EDM trend with upbeat, danceable songs. However, he won and represented Russia at the Junior Eurovision Song Contest 2015, finishing 6th overall with 80 points.

Following his Junior Eurovision appearance, Smirnov hosted Goryachaya Desyatochka (Top 10) on Karusel from around 2015 to its cancellation in 2018.

After Junior Eurovision, Smirnov produced some songs on his own. In September 2017, he wrote the song "I Would Like To Know Everything" for Veronika Ustimova, with which she took second place in the Russian national selection for Junior Eurovision 2017.

On May 19, 2018, his debut album 15, consisting of previously released singles, was released. The album was named for the number of tracks included in it, and also for having taken 15 months to write the songs. In addition to solo songs, several tracks on it were recorded with colleagues on the season 4 of The Voice Kids, such as Arina Danilova, Alisa Kozhikina, and Kirill Skripnik. The original album was supposed to be called "Dreamerboy". "Dreamerboy is me, a boy who dreams of big concerts and a new elegant music," Smirnov explained about the name. However, due to the peculiarities of placement on digital distribution sites, the name was changed.

In 2021, he released his breakthrough EP Party Without Internet that features his most ambient musical style by producing himself.

Acting 

In 2012, Smirnov performed at the Moscow International House of Music in the role of Mowgli in the musical Мы Одной Крови (We Have One Blood).

In December 2015, the new musical Баллада о маленьком сердце (The Ballad of a Heart) premiered with Smirnov in the role of Alyoshka.

In 2016–17, he played Nikita in The Circus of Miracles at the Ivanhoe Theater presented the New Year show Волшебный подарок Деда Мороза (The Magic Gift of Santa Claus).

On September 30, 2017, he took on Цирке чудес (Circus of Miracles), the premiere of another show, in which he played the main role, the Little Prince. He appeared with Irina Ukhanova and Evgeny Egorov.

Music making and producing career 
Aside from becoming a singer, he'd been an ambient music producer during his free time and now became on a full-time profession scale since 2022, along for his making for styles on upbeat tempo and lofi effects of arrangements and tracks for other artists, bloggers and tiktokers such as HARU, NKI, Nikita Zlatoust, Mimimizhka, Sonya SLEEPY, Tyoma Waterfork, KIRILL FELIX, Liza Didkovskaya, Dasha Volosevich, Vika Korobkova, Sasha Filin, Eva Barats, and Ivena Rabotova. He also makes musical scoring for film, television and short videos.

Discography

Albums/EPs 
 15 / DREAMERBØY (2018)
 Silence (2018)
 Height (2019)
 Rhythm of Guitar (2019)
 Party Without Internet (2021)

Singles 
 13 September 2015 - "Mechta" (Dream)
 3 May 2016 - "Nash Dom" (Our Homeland)
 12 March 2017 - "Parashyut" (Parachute)  
 23 April 2017 - "Virazhi" (Turn)
 13 May 2017 - "Nochnoy Izgoy" (An Outcast)
 29 May 2017 - "Ne Khvatayet" (Not Enough) (with Arina Danilova)
 24 June 2017 - "Opisat Tebya" (Asking You)
 15 July 2017 - "Prosti" (Sorry)
 5 August 2017 - "Vechnost" (Eternity)
 28 October 2017 - "03"
 25 November 2017 - "Ubegay" (Running Away)
 30 December 2017 - "Byli Schastlivy" (We're Happy)
 February 3, 2018 - "Your Name"	
 February 23, 2018 - "One Cannot Get Through" (with Kirill Skrypnyk)		
 March 8, 2018 - "Moon"	
 April 29, 2018 - "You Are Far" (with Alisa Kozhikina)
 May 13, 2018 - "My Light"
 30 December 2018 - "Not To Me"
 July 10, 2020 - "Left"
 October 20, 2020 - "Plaklana" (Cry)

Personal life 
He also writes poetry, plays football, and composes music during his free time.

Awards and nominations

References

External links
 
 

2003 births
Living people
Junior Eurovision Song Contest entrants for Russia
Russian child singers
Russian pop singers
Russian hip hop musicians
21st-century Russian singers
Singers from Moscow
The Voice Kids contestants
21st-century Russian male singers
Russian record producers